Webb Institute is a private college focused on engineering and located in Glen Cove, New York. Each graduate of Webb Institute earns a Bachelor of Science degree in naval architecture and marine engineering. Successful candidates for admission receive full tuition for four years. Webb Institute is noted in the marine industry for its unique emphasis on ship design, systems engineering, and practical work experience.

History 
Webb Institute of Naval Architecture was founded in 1889 by industrialist and philanthropist William Henry Webb, who had established his career as a preeminent shipbuilder in the 19th century. He recognized the increasing role of science and engineering in the field of ship design, which had long been seen as more of an art form. Webb felt that the ship designers of the future would need to be skilled in structural and mechanical engineering and other scientific disciplines. The institute graduated its first class in 1893 and continues to educate students in naval architecture and marine engineering.

Founding and early history

On April 2, 1889, the state of New York incorporated Webb's Academy and Home for Shipbuilders as a non-profit institution. Webb had provided the academy with an endowment presumed to be sufficient to allow the institution to be self-supporting in perpetuity. It was intended to serve not only as an educational institution for future naval architects but also as a retirement home for aged shipbuilders.

Construction commenced in 1890 and was completed in 1893. The building was designed in the Romanesque Revival style and was built of New York brownstone. It was intended to be "a romantic version of a medieval castle", with turrets, fanciful carving, and other flourishes. This facility was used for 50 years.

During World War II, the institute was closely associated with the U.S. Navy as a training center for naval officers.

Move and expansion

By 1945, the Board of Trustees determined that the Bronx campus was no longer suitable, lacking certain laboratory facilities, and ultimately sold it for a considerable sum. The site was redeveloped as the Fordham Hill Apartment complex.

In November 1945, the institute purchased its current home: The Braes, the former country estate of Herbert L. Pratt, in Glen Cove on the North Shore of Long Island.  Designed by James Brite and constructed between 1912 and 1914, the main house had a distinct H-shaped layout and Jacobean, Tudor, and Renaissance-influenced design elements that made it distinct among Long Island estates of the era.  It was the largest of the six Pratt estates in Glen Cove. Conversion work began in 1946.

In April 1947, classes began at the new campus in Glen Cove. The main building had been renovated to include classrooms, dormitories, and offices. A model basin and gymnasium were constructed elsewhere on the campus. The main building was renamed Stevenson Taylor Hall in honor of the charter member and president of the Board of Trustees (1900–1926) of the institute. Through the conversion, the ground floor of Stevenson Taylor Hall retained much of the original 1915-era decor.

A modern library and auditorium were added to the campus in 1971. Webb first admitted women as students in 1974.

Webb Institute was used for the exterior shots of Wayne Manor in the 1995 film Batman Forever, again in the 1997 film Batman & Robin, and for interior and exterior shots for the 2014 TV series Gotham. The Webb Institute reprised its earlier film role as Wayne Manor for the 2019 film Joker. It was also featured in the 1998 film Great Expectations. Interior and exterior shots appeared in the 2015 TV series Limitless in Season 1, Episode 14.

Administrators
There have been 18 administrators of the institute:

Academics
The student body of Webb Institute typically numbers around 90, with 20% being female. Webb currently has 12 full-time faculty members and no teaching assistants. Students have high access to professors, who routinely make themselves available at most hours. Adjunct faculty from local colleges teach some humanities courses at Webb such as Political Philosophy and Japanese.

There are four classrooms, one for each class. The school is atypical as the professors, rather than students, rotate to each classroom because of its small size. The front portion of the classroom is dedicated to lecture hours, while the rear has rows of drafting tables, one for each student, along with bookshelves and couches for 24-7 personalized study space.

The centerpiece of Webb's academic facilities is the -long model ship model basin, which is frequently used by students and faculty alike for experiments and research. Webb Institute has its own physics and chemistry laboratories, an extensive library, an engineering lab for mechanical and electrical experiments, a carpentry shop, and a machine shop. Students have limited around-the-clock access to these facilities. There is an emphasis throughout Webb's academic program on hands-on experience, and several classes require conducting experiments or building and testing models.

Webb Institute's coursework is intense. Students spend up to 5 hours per day in lecture and can spend several hours per day working outside of class. During the mandatory internship period from January through February each year, students seek positions in the maritime industry, including shipyards, design offices, and aboard merchant vessels. All seniors are required to complete a senior thesis.  Seniors are strongly encouraged to take the Fundamentals of Engineering exam, in which they usually perform exceptionally well.

85% of incoming students make it to graduation. Many graduates establish careers in the maritime industry, with 100% job placement. Graduates also forge careers in other engineering fields or find success in finance or law. About a third of each graduating class goes on to pursue an advanced degree. Webb has an active alumni association which supports graduates, fosters a thriving social network, and maintains an alumni fund. The alumni giving rate is over 70%, one of the highest rates in the United States.

Because of the founder's endowment and the high alumni giving rate, students who are U.S. citizens are not charged tuition at Webb.  Students pay for room and board, books, and various fees. The Bachelor of Science degree is awarded after four years of "total immersion" study, which includes several months of job experience through internship periods.

The institute maintains close relationships with the nearby United States Merchant Marine Academy and State University of New York Maritime College, along with Cooper Union.

Winter Work
Winter Work is Webb Institute's term for its unique internship periods. Webb students are required to work in certain areas of the marine industry for 8 weeks during the months of January and February. Freshmen act as apprentices/mechanics in shipyards or boatyards, and sophomores as cadets/observers at sea. Juniors and seniors perform internships in various engineering firms and design offices. By the time students graduate, they have 8 months of work experience. Recently, Winter Work has become increasingly more global, with several students traveling overseas to China, the Netherlands, Denmark, Greece, and the United Arab Emirates.

Accreditation
Webb Institute is accredited by the Middle States Commission on Higher Education. The Naval Architecture and Marine Engineering program is accredited by the Engineering Accreditation Commission of ABET.

Culture

Residential life
Students generally live on campus for all four years. Webb Institute has no fraternities or sororities. There is a student-run Social Committee at Webb that holds several parties throughout the year. The Social Committee also organizes off-campus trips throughout the year.

Honor Code
The student body adheres to an Honor Code, which prohibits lying, cheating, and stealing. The Student Organization administers the Honor Code, operates the student treasury, oversees social activities, and serves as liaison between students and the school administration.

Extracurricular activities
Webb has five intercollegiate athletic teams: sailing year-round, soccer and basketball in the fall, and volleyball and tennis in the spring.

Students have many options for recreation during their studies. The school has its own yacht club, automotive workshop, and English pub. Intercollegiate sports include sailing, tennis, soccer, volleyball, ultimate, and basketball. New York City is an hour away by the Long Island Rail Road. There are many student-led activity clubs on campus as well, both sporting and intellectual.

Webb won the 2018 HVIAC men's tennis championship. This is the first championship Webb sports has won in recent history.

Athletics 
The Webb athletic teams are the Webbies. The institute is a member of the United States Collegiate Athletic Association (USCAA), primarily competing in the Hudson Valley Intercollegiate Athletic Conference (HVIAC) for most of its sports since the 2004–05 academic year; while its sailing team competes in the Middle Atlantic Intercollegiate Sailing Association (MAISA).

Webb competes in five intercollegiate varsity sports: Men's sports include basketball, sailing, soccer, tennis and volleyball.

See also 
 Association of Independent Technological Universities
 Hudson Valley Intercollegiate Athletic Conference

References

Further reading

External links 
 Official website
 Official athletics website

Private universities and colleges in New York (state)
Yacht clubs in the United States
Glen Cove, New York
Universities and colleges on Long Island
Mansions of Gold Coast, Long Island
Educational institutions established in 1889
Engineering universities and colleges in New York (state)
Education in Nassau County, New York
 
1889 establishments in New York (state)
Fordham, Bronx